CenTrio, formerly known as the Seattle Steam Company, is a district heating public utility that provides steam (generated by burning natural gas, diesel oil, and recycled wood) to over 175 businesses in downtown Seattle and on First and Capitol Hills via 18 miles of steam pipeline. Its plants are located on Western Avenue at Union Street, just west of Pike Place Market, and on Post Avenue at Yesler Way, in Pioneer Square.

About 
Seattle Steam was founded in 1893 as the Seattle Steam Heat and Power Co. It owns 18 miles of pipes under the streets of Downtown.

Seattle Steam's biggest customers are Swedish Medical Center, Harborview Medical Center, and Virginia Mason Medical Center, which use the steam for heat and sterilization. Other big customers include hotels, which use the steam for heat and for generating hot water, Seattle Public Library, which uses it for heat and the Seattle Art Museum, which uses it for heat and humidity control.

In May 2014, Seattle Steam was bought by Enwave Energy Corporation, a unit of Brookfield Asset Management of Toronto, and renamed Enwave Seattle.

Gallery

See  also 
Holly Steam Combination Company
Utilities of Seattle

References

External links

http://www.seattlesteam.com/

Companies based in Seattle